Dutch Open may refer to:
Dutch Open (tennis), an ATP tennis tournament from 1957 to 2008
Dutch Open (golf), an annual golf tournament on the European Tour
Dutch Open (badminton)
Dutch Open (darts)